Rafe Pomerance (born July 19, 1946) is an American environmentalist. He is Chairman of Arctic 21, a network of organizations focused on communicating issues of Arctic climate change to policy-makers and the general public. Beginning in the late 1970s, he played a key role in raising awareness of the risks of climate change for United States policy-makers.

Early life and education 
Pomerance grew up in Greenwich, Connecticut, the son of Josephine (née Wertheim) and architect Ralph Pomerance. He is a grandson of Maurice Wertheim, and great-grandson of Henry Morgenthau Sr.

He graduated from Cornell University in 1968, with a B.A. in History.

Career 
After graduating from university, Pomerance served as a VISTA volunteer.

He was the operating chief at Friends of the Earth for four years until 1984. From 1986 to 1993, he served as a Senior Associate at the World Resources Institute.

In 1993, he was appointed Deputy Assistant Secretary of State for Environment and Development under U.S. president Bill Clinton. He left the department in 1999 and founded a non-profit, Climate Policy Center.

He is now a consultant for Rethink Energy Florida and the National Academy's Polar Research Board.

Climate change activism  
Pomerance first became interested in climate change after reading a 1978 EPA report, "Environmental Assessment of Coal Liquefaction: Annual Report". The report's prediction, which "warns that continued use of fossil fuels as a primary energy source for more than 20 to 30 more years could result in increased atmospheric levels of carbon dioxide. The greenhouse effect and associate global temperature increase and resulting climate changes could, according to NAS be both 'significant and damaging.'" led to Pomerance contacting a number of scientists for answers. He teamed up with scientist Gordon MacDonald and began scheduling meetings with government officials to discuss the issue of climate change. Their meeting with top White House scientist, Frank Press, prompted a National Academy of Sciences study, "Carbon Dioxide and Climate: A Scientific Assessment", informally known as the Charney report, the first formally recognized report on the impacts of CO2 on the climate.

In 1981, Pomerance met with atmospheric physicist James Hansen. He chose Hansen to speak as a witness at the Senate hearings, where then-House Representative Al Gore also spoke. However, these and other scientists' warnings that action needed to be taken were ignored by the Reagan-led government. Dismayed by the lack of attention and seriousness that Americans had for the warming planet, Pomerance resigned from Friends of the Earth in 1984.

Pomerance joined the World Resources Institute in 1986 and continued to attempt to fight for climate change policy. He convinced a senator to hold the June 10 and 11, 1986 hearings on “Ozone Depletion, the Greenhouse Effect, and Climate Change", with Hansen again speaking. Though previously unsuccessful, Hansen's 1988 testimonies on the effects of climate change are now regarded as a turning point in the public's awareness of the issue. Press coverage of the event was much more extensive, resulting in higher public awareness of the issue.  

In 1989, at the World Conference on the Changing Atmosphere, Pomerance suggested proposing a concrete goal. His suggestion was "a 20 percent reduction in carbon emissions by 2000." This goal became internationally known as a target for emission reductions.

Pomerance is considered by the Climate Institute an "Unsung Hero of the Climate Wars". His lobbying efforts in the 1980s were the subject of a 2018 New York Times article entitled "Losing Earth: The Decade We Almost Stopped Climate Change". The article brought significant attention to his past work.

Personal life 
Pomerance is married and has three children. He has lived in Washington, D.C. since 1975.

References

Living people
Climate activists
Place of birth missing (living people)
United States Department of State officials
Cornell University alumni
1946 births
American environmentalists
Wertheim family
Morgenthau family